Manoel do Nascimento (born 11 August 1926) was a Brazilian boxer. He competed in the men's bantamweight event at the 1948 Summer Olympics. At the 1948 Summer Olympics, he lost to Tibor Csík of Hungary.

References

External links
  

1926 births
Possibly living people
Brazilian male boxers
Olympic boxers of Brazil
Boxers at the 1948 Summer Olympics
Sportspeople from Rio de Janeiro (city)
Bantamweight boxers